Physique TV is the MENA region's first and only 24-hour HD television channel dedicated to physical fitness, healthy living, nutrition, and action sport. It is available in both Arabic and English.

Physique TV is a part of the SGT Group of companies. Established in 1996, SGT is one of the business groups headquartered in Dubai, United Arab Emirates.

Reach

 Arabsat - 20 million households
 Du (basic) UAE channel 412  - 227,000 households
 e life (basic) UAE channel 577 - 114,000 households
 Other cable channels - 500,000 households

Satellite television